The 1967 CFL season was the tenth Canadian Football League season, and the 14th season in modern-day Canadian football.

CFL news in 1967
The offices of the CFL was set up at 11 King Street, inside the Montreal Trust Building in Toronto, with Senator Keith Davey as CFL Commissioner. Later on, Davey was succeeded on Thursday, February 23 by Ted Workman and then later, Allan McEachern.

The Committee on One League (COO) made recommendations to bring operating matters to be under the control of the league; it was later approved by the Board of Governors.

The Canadian Rugby Union changed their name to Canadian Amateur Football Association (now Football Canada) on Sunday, January 1 and turned over the Grey Cup trophy to the CFL.

In addition, the CFL set up and establishes the Players' Pension Fund.

The Hamilton Tiger-Cats wore special helmets to commemorate Canada's Centennial as the country turned 100 years old.

Regular season standings

Final regular season standings
Note: GP = Games Played, W = Wins, L = Losses, T = Ties, PF = Points For, PA = Points Against, Pts = Points

Bold text means that they have clinched the playoffs.
Calgary and Hamilton have first round byes.

Grey Cup playoffs
Note: All dates in 1967

Conference Semi-Finals

Conference Finals

Playoff bracket

Grey Cup Championship

CFL Leaders
 CFL Passing Leaders
 CFL Rushing Leaders
 CFL Receiving Leaders

1967 CFL All-Stars

Offence
QB – Peter Liske, Calgary Stampeders
RB – George Reed, Saskatchewan Roughriders
RB – Bo Scott, Ottawa Rough Riders
RB – Jim Thomas, Edmonton Eskimos
SE – Terry Evanshen, Calgary Stampeders
TE – Tommy Joe Coffey, Hamilton Tiger-Cats
F – Whit Tucker, Ottawa Rough Riders
C – Ted Urness, Saskatchewan Roughriders
OG – Jack Abendschan, Saskatchewan Roughriders
OG – Roger Perdrix, Ottawa Rough Riders
OT – Clyde Brock, Saskatchewan Roughriders
OT – Bill Frank, Toronto Argonauts

Defence
DT – John Barrow, Hamilton Tiger-Cats
DT – Ed McQuarters, Saskatchewan Roughriders
DE – E. A. Sims, Edmonton Eskimos
DE – John Baker, Montreal Alouettes
LB – Wayne Harris, Calgary Stampeders
LB – Garner Ekstran, Saskatchewan Roughriders
LB – Wayne Shaw, Saskatchewan Roughriders
DB – Jerry Keeling, Calgary Stampeders
DB – Phil Brady, Montreal Alouettes
DB – Gene Gaines, Ottawa Rough Riders
DB – Garney Henley, Hamilton Tiger-Cats
DB – Frank Andruski, Calgary Stampeders

1967 Eastern All-Stars

Offence
QB – Russ Jackson, Ottawa Rough Riders
RB – Willie Bethea, Hamilton Tiger-Cats
RB – Bo Scott, Ottawa Rough Riders
RB – Jim Dillard, Toronto Argonauts
SE – Margene Adkins, Ottawa Rough Riders
TE – Tommy Joe Coffey, Hamilton Tiger-Cats
F – Whit Tucker, Ottawa Rough Riders
C – Gene Ceppetelli, Hamilton Tiger-Cats
OG – Bill Danychuk, Hamilton Tiger-Cats
OG – Roger Perdrix, Ottawa Rough Riders
OT – Danny Nykoluk, Toronto Argonauts
OT – Bill Frank, Toronto Argonauts

Defence
DT – John Barrow, Hamilton Tiger-Cats
DT – Bob Minihane, Montreal Alouettes
DE – Bob Brown, Ottawa Rough Riders
DE – John Baker, Montreal Alouettes
LB – Ken Lehmann, Ottawa Rough Riders
LB – Mike Blum, Toronto Argonauts
LB – Bob Krouse, Hamilton Tiger-Cats
DB – Jim Rountree, Toronto Argonauts
DB – Phil Brady, Montreal Alouettes
DB – Gene Gaines, Ottawa Rough Riders
DB – Garney Henley, Hamilton Tiger-Cats
DB – Marv Luster, Toronto Argonauts

1967 Western All-Stars

Offence
QB – Peter Liske, Calgary Stampeders
RB – George Reed, Saskatchewan Roughriders
RB – Dave Raimey, Winnipeg Blue Bombers
RB – Jim Thomas, Edmonton Eskimos
SE – Terry Evanshen, Calgary Stampeders
TE – Herm Harrison, Calgary Stampeders
F – Ken Nielsen, Winnipeg Blue Bombers
C – Ted Urness, Saskatchewan Roughriders
OG – Jack Abendschan, Saskatchewan Roughriders
OG – Bob Lueck, Calgary Stampeders
OT – Clyde Brock, Saskatchewan Roughriders
OT – Roger Kramer, Calgary Stampeders

Defence
DT – John LaGrone, Edmonton Eskimos
DT – Ed McQuarters, Saskatchewan Roughriders
DE – Bill Whisler, Winnipeg Blue Bombers
DE – Dick Suderman, Calgary Stampeders
LB – Wayne Harris, Calgary Stampeders
LB – Garner Ekstran, Saskatchewan Roughriders
LB – Wayne Shaw, Saskatchewan Roughriders
DB – Jerry Keeling, Calgary Stampeders
DB – John Wydarney, Edmonton Eskimos
DB – Joe Hernandez, Edmonton Eskimos
DB – Bruce Bennett, Saskatchewan Roughriders
DB – Frank Andruski, Calgary Stampeders

1967 CFL Awards
CFL's Most Outstanding Player Award – Peter Liske (QB), Calgary Stampeders
CFL's Most Outstanding Canadian Award – Terry Evanshen (TE), Calgary Stampeders
CFL's Most Outstanding Lineman Award – Ed McQuarters (DT), Saskatchewan Roughriders
CFL's Coach of the Year – Jerry Williams, Calgary Stampeders
 Jeff Russel Memorial Trophy (Eastern MVP) – Ron Stewart (RB), Ottawa Rough Riders
 Jeff Nicklin Memorial Trophy (Western MVP) - Peter Liske (QB), Calgary Stampeders
 Gruen Trophy (Eastern Rookie of the Year) - Wayne Giardino (LB), Ottawa Rough Riders
 Dr. Beattie Martin Trophy (Western Rookie of the Year) - Ted Gerela (K), BC Lions
 DeMarco–Becket Memorial Trophy (Western Outstanding Lineman) - John LaGrone (DT), Edmonton Eskimos

References 

CFL
Canadian Football League seasons